Molecule Man is an isometric 3D action-adventure video game released by Mastertronic in 1986 for a variety of 8-bit home computers. A level editor is included which enables the player to design their own mazes.

Plot
Molecule Man is trapped in a radioactive maze and must reach the escape teleport before the radiation kills him.

Gameplay

The player controls the Molecule Man in his quest to escape within a time limit. He must find the teleport and repair it using 16 circuit board pieces that are scattered around the maze. Bombs must be purchased to blow open inaccessible areas. Meanwhile, the radiation is killing him and health pills must be purchased to prolong his life.

Coins can be found lying around. These must be collected and taken to dispensers to purchase bombs and pills.

Reception
ZX Computing wrote, "No not another 3-D maze game! 'Fraid so". A 1986 review for Sinclair User was more positive:

References

External links

Molecule Man at Atari Mania

1986 video games
Action-adventure games
Video games with isometric graphics
ZX Spectrum games
Amstrad CPC games
Commodore 64 games
Atari 8-bit family games
Commodore 16 and Plus/4 games
MSX games
Video games developed in the United Kingdom
Mastertronic games